Psychiatry of Vestfold Trust was until 2011 Norway's only health trust which deals solely with psychiatric issues and is based in Vestfold. From 2012 it is a part of Vestfold Hospital.

The psychiatry in Vestfold was separated from Vestfold Hospital in 2000 and is organised in the following sections: 
 Nordre Vestfold DPS (formerly Linde and Grefsrud) - based in Tønsberg and Holmestrand.
 Søndre Vestfold DPS (formerly Furubakken and Preståsen) - based in Larvik and Sandefjord.
 Psychiatric medicine. Deals with acute cases, long-term psychiatric treatment, special polyclinics for treatment of ADHD, ECT therapy and help for young people with psychosis.
 Children and young people's psychiatry (BUPA)
 The Vestfold Clinic
 Glenne Centre for autism

The overall head of Psychiatry of Vestfold Trust is currently administrative director Finn Hall.

External links
 Psychiatry of Vestfold Trust

Defunct health trusts of Norway
Psychiatric hospitals in Norway